Brian David McNichol (born May 20, 1974) is an American former professional baseball pitcher.

McNichol played collegiate baseball for James Madison University, where he compiled an 18–7 win-loss record between 1993 and 1995. In 1994, he played collegiate summer baseball with the Wareham Gatemen of the Cape Cod Baseball League.

References

External links

1974 births
Living people
American expatriate baseball players in Canada
Baseball players from Virginia
Birmingham Barons players
Charlotte Knights players
Chattanooga Lookouts players
Chicago Cubs players
Columbus Clippers players
Daytona Cubs players
Gulf Coast Cubs players
Iowa Cubs players
James Madison Dukes baseball players
Louisville RiverBats players
Major League Baseball pitchers
Orlando Rays players
Ottawa Lynx players
Sportspeople from Fairfax, Virginia
Wareham Gatemen players
West Tennessee Diamond Jaxx players
Williamsport Cubs players